Plešivica may refer to:

Croatia 
 Plešivica, Selnica, a settlement in Selnica, Međimurje County
 Plešivica, Vrbovsko, a settlement in Vrbovsko, Primorje-Gorski Kotar County
 Plešivica, Jastrebarsko, a settlement in Zagreb County

Slovenia 
 Plešivica, Brezovica
 Plešivica, Ljutomer
 Plešivica, Sežana
 Plešivica, Žužemberk